The Australia national cricket team toured New Zealand from February to March 1993 and played a three-match Test series against the New Zealand national cricket team. The Test series was drawn 1–1. New Zealand were captained by Martin Crowe and Australia by Allan Border. In addition, the teams played a five-match series of Limited Overs Internationals (LOI) which Australia won 3–2.

Test series summary

1st Test

2nd Test

3rd Test

One Day Internationals (ODIs)

Australia won the Bank of New Zealand Trophy 3-2.

1st ODI

2nd ODI

3rd ODI

4th ODI

5th ODI

References

External links

1993 in Australian cricket
1993 in New Zealand cricket
1993
International cricket competitions from 1991–92 to 1994
New Zealand cricket seasons from 1970–71 to 1999–2000